Tiruppur railway station is a railway station serving the city of Tiruppur, or the textile city of India.The station under the jurisdiction of the Salem railway division. And it is a major railway station of the Southern Railway zone, one of the 17 Railway Zones of the Indian Railways. It is also known by its official code:TUP.

Location and layout
The Tiruppur railway station is located at the heart of the Tiruppur city, at close proximity to the Old Bus Station of the city. The new bus stand located at PN road at the Northern part of the city is a 10–15 minutes drive from the station.

The train station falls on the Chennai–Palakkad broad-gauge line (laid in 1983) which is fully electrified and has two tracks. Almost every daily Express train or long-distance trains has a halt in the station except for a select few such as the Trivandrum Mail and the Bangalore Kochuveli Express.

Despite Tiruppur being one of the top revenue generating stations in the Salem Division, the railway station has only 2 platforms and no starting trains from the city exist. About 30,000 passengers travel to Tiruppur per day despite not being a railway junction. As a result, Tirupur railway station is always over-crowded. Also most of the trains stops for only 2 mins which makes the cargo handling not at all possible.

The nearest airport to the station is the Coimbatore International Airport situated 35 km west of the city. The nearby stations are the suburbs of Kulipalayam towards the East and Vanjipalayam towards the West.

References

External links
 Indiarailinfo

Salem railway division
Railway stations in Tiruppur district
Tiruppur